Sonoma–Marin Area Rail Transit, or SMART, is a commuter rail service in California's Sonoma and Marin counties.  the line serves 12 stations: ten opened in the initial operating segment (IOS) and two were added when the line was extended to Larkspur. Four more stations are planned to open after further construction.

The main line was built primarily by the Northwestern Pacific Railroad and received regular service until 1958 when passenger trains were discontinued south of Willits. After the decline in railway traffic in the post-WWII years, the line was eventually closed to all rail activity. The right-of-way was acquired by a special-purpose district and reopened to freight movements in 2011 and passenger service on August 25, 2017.

Gauntlet tracks are installed at stations north of Ignacio to allow freight trains to pass with proper clearance. Novato Downtown, San Rafael, and Santa Rosa stations are located adjacent to former NWP station buildings (as will be Healdsburg and Windsor), but the buildings are used for other purposes.

Stations

Notes
 Station opened to limited preview service on June 29, 2017.
 Station opened to limited preview service on July 1, 2017.
 Station opened to limited preview service on July 8, 2017.

 Free street parking

Future stations

Suggestions have been put forward to eventually expand to Napa or Solano counties with connections at Suisun–Fairfield station, or north along the Northwestern Pacific right of way to Ukiah or Willits in Mendocino.

References

External links

SMART - Stations

Sonoma-Marin Area Rail Transit stations
Sonoma-Marin Area Rail Transit
Sonoma-Marin Area Rail Transit